Thomas Chafe (c. 1611 – 1662) was an English lawyer and politician who sat in the House of Commons in 1660.

Chafe was the son  of John Chafe, a merchant of Exeter, Devon and his wife Anne May, daughter of William May of North Molton, Devon. His father died in 1619. He was a student of Middle Temple in 1631 and was called to the bar in 1638. He became a Bencher of Middle Temple in 1659. In 1660, he was elected Member of Parliament for Totnes.  He was a J.P. for Dorset from July 1660 and a commissioner  for assessment from August 1660.
 
Chafe died at the age of about 50 and was buried in the Temple Church on 3 July 1662.

Chafe married by licence dated 28 December 1641 Catherine Malet, daughter of Sir Thomas Malet, of St. Audries, Somerset and had a son and five daughters.

References

1611 births
1662 deaths
English MPs 1660
Lawyers from Devon
Members of the Middle Temple
Members of the Parliament of England (pre-1707) for Totnes
17th-century English lawyers